NISM may refer to:

 National Institute of Securities Markets, an Indian public trust
 Nexus International School Malaysia, a private international school based in Putrajaya, Malaysia